These 101 species belong to Anadenobolus, a genus of millipedes in the family Rhinocricidae.

Anadenobolus species

 Anadenobolus anguinus (Pocock, 1894)
 Anadenobolus angusticollis (Karsch, 1881)
 Anadenobolus aposematus (Pocock, 1907)
 Anadenobolus approximans (Hoffman, 1950)
 Anadenobolus approximatus (Loomis, 1968)
 Anadenobolus arboreus (DeSaussure, 1859)
 Anadenobolus atoyacus Pocock, 1907
 Anadenobolus aurocinctus (Pocock, 1907)
 Anadenobolus aztecus (DeSaussure, 1859)
 Anadenobolus beliganus Chamberlin, 1918
 Anadenobolus brevicollis (Voges, 1878)
 Anadenobolus bruesi (Chamberlin, 1918)
 Anadenobolus centralis (Chamberlin, 1922)
 Anadenobolus chamberlini (Schubart, 1951)
 Anadenobolus chazaliei (Brolemann, 1900)
 Anadenobolus chichen (Chamberlin, 1953)
 Anadenobolus chichimecus (DeSaussure, 1859)
 Anadenobolus chitarianus (Chamberlin, 1933)
 Anadenobolus cinchonanus (Chamberlin, 1922)
 Anadenobolus consociatus (Pocock, 1894)
 Anadenobolus consutus (Loomis, 1936)
 Anadenobolus costaricensis (Brolemann, 1905)
 Anadenobolus cuba (Perez-Asso, 1998)
 Anadenobolus curtior (Chamberlin, 1918)
 Anadenobolus dentatus (Perez-Asso, 1998)
 Anadenobolus dissimulans Bond & Sierwald, 2003
 Anadenobolus dugesi (Bollman, 1893)
 Anadenobolus edenus (Chamberlin, 1947)
 Anadenobolus escambray (Perez-Asso, 1998)
 Anadenobolus excisus (Karsch, 1881)
 Anadenobolus ferrugineus (Daday, 1889)
 Anadenobolus gisleni (Verhoeff, 1941)
 Anadenobolus gracilipes (Karsch, 1881)
 Anadenobolus grammostictus (Pocock, 1894)
 Anadenobolus grenadensis (Pocock, 1894)
 Anadenobolus guadeloupensis (Chamberlin, 1918)
 Anadenobolus hegedusi (Daday, 1889)
 Anadenobolus hegedussi (Daday, 1889)
 Anadenobolus heteroscopus (Chamberlin, 1918)
 Anadenobolus holomelanus (Pocock, 1894)
 Anadenobolus insulatus (Chamberlin, 1925)
 Anadenobolus ixtapanus (Chamberlin, 1943)
 Anadenobolus jibacoa (Perez-Asso, 1998)
 Anadenobolus juxtus (Chamberlin, 1918)
 Anadenobolus lamprus (Chamberlin, 1943)
 Anadenobolus laticollis (Loomis, 1934)
 Anadenobolus leptopus (Pocock, 1894)
 Anadenobolus leucostigma (Pocock, 1894)
 Anadenobolus liparius (Chamberlin, 1918)
 Anadenobolus liparus (Chamberlin, 1918)
 Anadenobolus macropus (Pocock, 1894)
 Anadenobolus malkini (Chamberlin, 1956)
 Anadenobolus marci (Pocock, 1907)
 Anadenobolus mayanus (Chamberlin, 1947)
 Anadenobolus mediator (Chamberlin, 1918)
 Anadenobolus mertensi (Kraus, 1954)
 Anadenobolus modestior (Silvestri, 1905)
 Anadenobolus monilicornis (von Porat, 1876)  (yellow-banded millipede)
 Anadenobolus monitongo (Perez-Asso, 1998)
 Anadenobolus morelus (Chamberlin, 1943)
 Anadenobolus motulensis (Chamberlin, 1938)
 Anadenobolus newtonianus (Chamberlin, 1918)
 Anadenobolus nicaraguanus (Chamberlin, 1922)
 Anadenobolus nitidanus (Brölemann, 1919)
 Anadenobolus nodosicollis (Brolemann, 1905)
 Anadenobolus obesus (Brolemann, 1900)
 Anadenobolus ochraceus (Brölemann, 1900)
 Anadenobolus ocraceus (Brolemann, 1900)
 Anadenobolus olivaceus (Newport, 1844)
 Anadenobolus pedernales Peréz-Asso, 2004
 Anadenobolus pedrocola (Chamberlin, 1947)
 Anadenobolus perplicatus (Loomis, 1938)
 Anadenobolus pertenuis (Loomis, 1938)
 Anadenobolus plesius (Chamberlin, 1914)
 Anadenobolus politus (von Porat, 1888)
 Anadenobolus potosianus (Chamberlin, 1941)
 Anadenobolus potrerillo (Perez-Asso, 1998)
 Anadenobolus putealis (Loomis, 1971)
 Anadenobolus ramagei (Pocock, 1894)
 Anadenobolus rarior (Chamberlin, 1918)
 Anadenobolus rixi (Pocock, 1907)
 Anadenobolus rogersi (Pocock, 1907)
 Anadenobolus sagittatus (Loomis, 1938)
 Anadenobolus salleanus (Pocock, 1907)
 Anadenobolus scobinatus (Pocock, 1907)
 Anadenobolus simulans (Chamberlin, 1922)
 Anadenobolus simulatus (Chamberlin, 1950)
 Anadenobolus sinuosus (Loomis, 1938)
 Anadenobolus smithi (Pocock, 1907)
 Anadenobolus socius (Chamberlin, 1918)
 Anadenobolus stolli (Pocock, 1907)
 Anadenobolus tejerianus (Chamberlin, 1953)
 Anadenobolus toltecus (DeSaussure, 1859)
 Anadenobolus totanacus (De Saussure, 1860)
 Anadenobolus totonacus (DeSaussure, 1860)
 Anadenobolus translocatus (Loomis, 1975)
 Anadenobolus varians (Brölemann, 1901)
 Anadenobolus vincenti (Pocock, 1894)
 Anadenobolus vincentii (Pocock, 1894)
 Anadenobolus williamsi (Chamberlin, 1940)
 Anadenobolus zapotecus (DeSaussure, 1860)

References

Anadenobolus